Telnor, or Teléfonos del Noroeste ("Telephones of the Northwest") is a company providing telephone and internet services since 1981 (DSL through Prodigy and E1). It operates in the Mexican states of Baja California and part of the northwest of Sonora, It is part of América Móvil Telecom, which is owned by billionaire Carlos Slim.

See also
 Telmex - sister telephone company within Grupo Carso
 Axtel - competition in the local telephone market
 Prodigy - its provider of DSL service

External links
Telnor official website (in Spanish)

Telecommunications companies established in 1981
Mobile phone companies of Mexico